Puya boliviensis is a species of flowering plant in the Bromeliaceae family. This species is endemic to Chile.

References

Chilean Bromeliaceae: diversity, distribution and evaluation of conservation status (Published online: 10 March 2009)

boliviensis
Endemic flora of Chile
Taxa named by John Gilbert Baker